Scutelarin (taipan activator, Oxyuranus scutellatus prothrombin-activating proteinase) is an enzyme. This enzyme catalyses the following chemical reaction

 Selective cleavage of Arg-Thr and Arg-Ile in prothrombin to form thrombin and two inactive fragments

This enzyme is isolated from the venom of the Taipan snake (Oxyuranus scutellatus).

References

External links 
 

EC 3.4.21